Amnesia is the first EP from Philadelphia's Paint It Black. It was released by Bridge 9 Records on June 16, 2009. It was released as a 7" single and a digital download. It is the first of two EPs the band plans to release in 2009

Track listing
 "Salem" – 1:53
 "Homesick" – 1:29
 "Nicotine" – 1:20
 "Amnesia" – 1:32
 "Bliss" – 3:31

Personnel
Dan Yemin – vocals, guitar
Josh Agran – guitar
Andy Nelson – bass guitar, vocals
Jared Shavelson – drums

References

Paint It Black (band) albums
2009 EPs
Bridge 9 Records EPs
Albums produced by Kurt Ballou